The 1948–49 Rugby Football League season was the 54th season of rugby league football. This was Whitehaven's inaugural season in the League.

Season summary
Warrington finished the regular season as the league leaders. However, Huddersfield won their sixth Championship when they beat Warrington 13–12 in the championship final. The game, played at Maine Road, Manchester, attracted a crowd of 75,194 and receipts of £11,073 setting new records for both attendances and receipts for a rugby league game played anywhere other than Wembley. Huddersfield's Australian fullback, Johnny Hunter scored 16 tries during the season, breaking the record for a fullback set by Jim Sullivan.

The Challenge Cup winners were Bradford who beat Halifax 12–0 in the final.

Warrington won the Lancashire League, and Huddersfield won the Yorkshire League. Wigan beat Warrington 14–8 to win the Lancashire Cup and Bradford Northern beat Castleford 18–9 to win the Yorkshire Cup.

Championship

Play-offs

Challenge Cup

The Challenge Cup tournament's final was to be played by Bradford and Halifax at Wembley Stadium. It was the first time tickets to the Challenge Cup final were sold out. Bradford won the game 12–0 in the final played in front of a world record rugby league crowd of 95,050. Trevor Foster and Eric Batten scored the tries for Bradford and Ernest Ward kicked three goals as well as winning the Lance Todd Trophy for man-of-the-match.

This was Bradford's fourth Cup Final win in seven Final appearances including one win and one loss during World War II.

Sources
 1948-49 Rugby Football League season at wigan.rlfans.com

References

1948 in English rugby league
1949 in English rugby league
Northern Rugby Football League seasons